Ivan Aleksandrovich Lapin (born 8 May 1988) is a Russian former football defender.

Career 
An Akademika football school graduate, he started playing for Zenit Reserves in 2007. He played once for Zenit in the Russian Cup. He had a contract with Zenit until 31 December 2009. On 13 March 2009 FC Zenit Saint Petersburg the young defender went on loan to FC Rostov. He returned at the end of the season, but did not get into the first team. He joined Baltika Kaliningrad for the 2011–12 season.

References 

Russian footballers
FC Zenit Saint Petersburg players
1988 births
Living people
FC Rostov players
Russian Premier League players
FC Baltika Kaliningrad players
Association football defenders
PFC Spartak Nalchik players
FC Sportakademklub Moscow players
People from Zelenograd